Tony Fitzpatrick may refer to:
 Tony Fitzpatrick (artist) (born 1958), American artist
 Tony Fitzpatrick (engineer) (1951–2003), British structural engineer
 Tony Fitzpatrick (footballer) (born 1956), Scottish football player and manager

See also 
 Fitzpatrick (surname)
 Fitzpatrick (disambiguation)